Forsyth County is the name of two counties in the United States:

Forsyth County, Georgia
Forsyth County, North Carolina